The Altoona Transportation Center is an intermodal passenger facility built in 1986 providing local bus, intercity bus, and rail services.  It is located at 1231 11th Avenue in downtown Altoona, Pennsylvania.  It replaced the original PRR Altoona station built in the 1880s.  The Transportation Center's modernist-influenced main building is built into the lower levels of a parking garage and connects to a network of pedestrian bridges which criss-cross the busy roads and tracks surrounding the facility.  The Center also features a 300-foot-long bus platform capable of serving up to ten buses at once.  The interior of the Center features a melt shop and a branch of the Altoona Area Public Library.  There are also vending machines available offering travelers snacks and drinks.

Bus Service

AMTRAN 
AMTRAN is the local public transit provider in the greater Altoona area and the primary user of the Altoona Transportation Center.  Almost all regular AMTRAN bus routes and selected "Tripper" routes stop at the center, which is considered the AMTRAN system's primary hub.  AMTRAN is typically the sole user of the bus platform, though exceptions have been made due to road work or special events.

Greyhound 
Greyhound provides intercity bus service to the station with a single route.  It connects Altoona via one-seat rides to cities such as State College and Harrisburg to the east and Johnstown and Pittsburgh to the west.   Buses 4690 and 4692 run eastbound with a terminus of Harrisburg in the morning and evening respectively.  Buses 4691 and 4693 head West toward Pittsburgh.  The prior/following stops of Tyrone and Ebensburg are treated as flag stops, due to their lack of staffed ticket service.

Train service 
The Altoona Transportation Center is also served by Amtrak's Pennsylvanian. These trains operate once per day in each direction. Eastbound #42 is scheduled at 10:01 a.m., while Westbound #43 is scheduled at 5:13 p.m. Due to the train running on freight right-of-way, there are frequent delays which cause the scheduled times to serve mostly as estimates.

Primary cities served by Amtrak to and from Altoona include Harrisburg, Lancaster, Philadelphia, and New York to the east and Johnstown and Pittsburgh to the west.  Staffed ticket service is available for both daily departures.

History 

The Altoona Transportation Center stands on the site of the old Altoona station, which was constructed in 1887 immediately to the West of the Logan House Hotel.  The old station building was demolished in 1971, however construction on the Transportation Center did not begin until after 1982, leaving Altoona without a proper train station for over a decade.  In order to maintain a station stop in the city, Amtrak installed a construction trailer in a small parking lot along the recently-reconstructed PRR Expressway (10th Avenue).  This temporary station lacked an elevated platform, indoor bathrooms, and staffed ticket service.

The Transportation Center's planning was a controversial topic in the Altoona area.  Candidates for various city positions structured their campaigns around the expense of, feasibility of, and location of the pending transit hub.  Projected costs ranged anywhere from 10 million dollars to 3 million dollars.  On August 12, 1982, the Altoona Area Chamber of Commerce voted unanimously in favor of a new Transportation Center.  By October of the same year Harry Weese and Associates, an architectural firm from Washington D.C., had been chosen to conduct a series of surveys in order to determine the optimal location for the proposed structure.  Ultimately, urban renewal parcels 14A, 14B, 16A, and 16B were chosen, and the Transportation Center was merged into an existing Altoona Parking Authority project, creating the hybrid parking garage/transit facility that exists today.  The facility opened on October 23, 1986 after being completed for $3.2 million, an estimated $500,000 under budget. The cost of construction was completely covered by a federal grant.

The early days of Amtrak service were turbulent.  Over the fifteen-year span that Altoona was served by a temporary station, the National Limited (a replacement service for the famous Spirit of St. Louis) made both its first stop in the city as well as its last, as did the Keystone and Fort Pitt.  By the Transit Center's completion, Altoona was served by only two daily trains, the Broadway Limited and the Pennsylvanian.  In 1995 the  Broadway Limited was suspended and replaced by the Three Rivers, which lasted until 2005. Upon its cancellation, the lone Pennsylvanian marked the first time in Altoona's significant railway history that the town was served by just a single, daily passenger train in each direction.

In March 2020, the Pennsylvanian was suspended as part of a system-wide service reduction in response to the growing COVID-19 pandemic.  Service resumed on June 1, 2020.

Gallery

References

External links

Greyhound official site
AMTRAN official site
Altoona Transportation Center (USA Rail Guide -- Train Web)

Amtrak stations in Pennsylvania
Buildings and structures in Altoona, Pennsylvania
Transit centers in the United States
Stations on the Pittsburgh Line
Railway stations in Blair County, Pennsylvania